Huw Lewis (born 17 January 1964) is a  Welsh Labour Co-operative politician who served as Minister for Education and Skills from 2013 to 2016. Born in Merthyr Tydfil, Glamorgan, Lewis represented the Merthyr Tydfil and Rhymney constituency in the National Assembly for Wales from 1999 to 2016.

Early life
Born in Merthyr Tydfil and brought up in Aberfan, he attended the University of Edinburgh. Active in the local Scottish Labour Party, he worked for both Labour Party leader John Smith and later Donald Dewar. Lewis campaigned for a Scottish Assembly alongside Edinburgh Labour Club colleagues Douglas and Wendy Alexander, and Pat McFadden.

Returning to South Wales, Lewis worked briefly as a chemistry teacher at Afon Taf High School, before working full-time for the Labour Party.

Political career
Elected to the position of Assistant General Secretary of Welsh Labour, he organised the campaign for the Labour "Yes" Vote campaign in 1997, that lead to the creation of the Welsh National Assembly.

Elected to the National Assembly for Wales in 1999 as a Labour and Co-operative Party candidate to represent Merthyr Tydfil and Rhymney. He has been party Whip in the Assembly, a post he resigned following the resignation of Alun Michael as First Secretary. He has also been Deputy Minister for Education and Lifelong Learning in October 2000, a post he resigned following the use of a landfill site in Trecatti, within his constituency, for the disposal of carcasses during the foot and mouth crisis (16 April 2001).

He was re-elected in 2003 and was appointed Deputy Minister for Social Justice and Regeneration in May 2003. In the Third Assembly he was appointed Deputy Minister for the Economy and Transport on 31 May 2007 but announced to the media that due to his private opposition to One Wales coalition deal with Plaid Cymru he had been sacked on 18 July 2007, having been the only one of Labour's then 26 AMs to vote against Labour's coalition with Plaid Cymru.

On 26 June 2013 in light of the resignation of Leighton Andrews, Lewis was appointed Minister for Education and Skills. Not being a Welsh language speaker, that brief was returned to First Minister Carwyn Jones.

In January 2016, Lewis announced that he would leave the Assembly at the election in May of that year.

Personal life
Lewis is married to his second wife Lynne Neagle, the Labour Assembly member for Torfaen and they have a son.

In August 2021 Lewis was appointed as the Political and Membership Officer for Wales at the Co-operative Party

References

The Wales Yearbook 2006
BBC Wales 18 May 2007

External links
Website of the Welsh Assembly Government

Offices held

1964 births
Living people
Alumni of the University of Edinburgh
Welsh schoolteachers
Labour Co-operative members of the Senedd
Wales AMs 1999–2003
Wales AMs 2003–2007
Wales AMs 2007–2011
Wales AMs 2011–2016
Members of the Welsh Assembly Government
Welsh bloggers
Welsh socialists
Politics of Merthyr Tydfil
People from Merthyr Tydfil
People from Aberfan